This Is Jeremy Steig is an album by American jazz flautist Jeremy Steig released on the Solid State label in 1969. The album features three compositions by folksinger Tim Hardin whom Steig had accompanied in 1966.

Track listing
All compositions by Jeremy Steig except where noted
 "Flute Diddley" − 6:41
 "Hang On to a Dream" (Tim Hardin) − 3:01
 "Teresa's Blues" (Chris Hills) − 10:46
 "Don't Make Promises" (Hardin) − 5:40
 "Rational Nonsense" − 7:42
 "Lenny's Tomb" (Hardin) − 5:12
 "Insanity" − 0:56
 "Mac D" − 2:06

Personnel
Jeremy Steig – flute, alto flute, piccolo, bansuri
Warren Bernhardt – electric piano
Glen Moore − bass, electric upright bass
Donald MacDonald – drums
Technical
Malcolm Addey - engineer
Frank Guana - art direction

References

Solid State Records (jazz label) albums
Jeremy Steig albums
1969 albums
Albums produced by Sonny Lester